Cardioglossa is a genus of frogs in the family Arthroleptidae known as long-fingered frogs. They are native to western and central Africa, with the greatest species richness in Cameroon. Some of the more localized species are threatened.

Species
There are 19 species of Cardioglossa:
Cardioglossa alsco  — Alsco long-fingered frog
Cardioglossa annulata  — Annulated long-fingered frog
Cardioglossa congolia  — Congolian long-fingered frog
Cardioglossa cyaneospila  — Mukuzira long-fingered frog
Cardioglossa elegans  — Elegant long-fingered frog
Cardioglossa escalerae  — Equatorial Guinea long-fingered frog
Cardioglossa gracilis  — Rio Benito long-fingered frog
Cardioglossa gratiosa  — Ongot long-fingered frog
Cardioglossa inornata  
Cardioglossa leucomystax  — Silver long-fingered frog
Cardioglossa melanogaster  — Amiet's long-fingered frog
Cardioglossa manengouba 
Cardioglossa nigromaculata) — Blackspotted long-fingered frog
Cardioglossa occidentalis  — Western long-fingered frog
Cardioglossa oreas  — Mount Okou long-fingered frog
Cardioglossa pulchra  — Black long-fingered frog
Cardioglossa schioetzi  — Acha Tugi long-fingered frog
Cardioglossa trifasciata  — Nsoung long-fingered frog
Cardioglossa venusta  — Highland long-fingered frog

References

 
Arthroleptidae
Amphibians of Africa
Amphibian genera
Taxa named by George Albert Boulenger